Yoelmis Hernández Paumier (born 25 April 1986 in Nueva Gerona, Cuba) is a Cuban weightlifter competing in the 85 kg category. He finished in seventh place at the 2012 Summer Olympics. He competed at the 2016 Summer Olympics.

Hernández won the 85 kg gold medals in snatch and clean & jerk during the 2014 Pan American Sports Festival.

References

External links 
 

Cuban male weightlifters
1986 births
Living people
Weightlifters at the 2012 Summer Olympics
Weightlifters at the 2016 Summer Olympics
People from Nueva Gerona
Olympic weightlifters of Cuba
Weightlifters at the 2015 Pan American Games
Pan American Games medalists in weightlifting
Pan American Games gold medalists for Cuba
Medalists at the 2015 Pan American Games
20th-century Cuban people
21st-century Cuban people